Meriden Transit Center is a train station on the New Haven–Springfield Line located in Meriden, Connecticut. The station was rebuilt from 2014 to 2017 for the Hartford Line service, which began on June 16, 2018.

History

The Hartford and New Haven Railroad opened from New Haven to Meriden in December 1838, and to Hartford in December 1839. The initial station was "shed-like"; services were moved to Conklin's Hotel in 1840 and the Rodgers Building in 1842.

The New York, New Haven and Hartford Railroad built a brick colonial revival station in 1942. The city demolished that station and built a one-story brick station in 1970 as part of a downtown revitalization program.

Reconstruction
The station was reconstructed for use by Hartford Line commuter service, which began operation on June 16, 2018. The new station, located on the site of the 1970-built station, has two accessible six car long, high-level side platforms connected by an overhead pedestrian bridge. It is not staffed, heated, or equipped with toilet facilities. It has 65 surface parking spaces, and 225 spaces reserved for Hartford Line customers in a nearby garage. Demolition of an adjacent building to make room for the parking lot began in October 2014.

The ticket office in the 1970-built station building was closed on March 4, 2016, and the station building itself closed for demolition on March 12. The old platform was replaced by a temporary boarding area on March 28, 2016. The frame of the new station was completed in July 2016. The rebuilt Meriden station opened on November 19, 2017, though final construction lasted until December 18.

Connections

Meriden is served by bus routes on three local systems:
Connecticut Transit Meriden: 561, 563, 564, 565, 566
Connecticut Transit New Haven: 215M/215Mx
Middletown Area Transit: M-Link

References

External links

Meriden – Hartford Line
Meriden Amtrak Station (USA Rail Guide -- Train Web)

Amtrak stations in Connecticut
Stations on the New Haven–Springfield Line
Buildings and structures in Meriden, Connecticut
Railroad stations in New Haven County, Connecticut
Railway stations in the United States opened in 1838
Railway stations in the United States opened in 2017